"Baby on board" is the message of a small (usually ) sign intended to be placed in the back window of an automobile to caution other drivers that an infant is travelling in the automobile.

The intention of the sign is often confused with a warning to emergency personnel (Tot Finder) in case of emergency, as there may be a baby in the vehicle. However, this is historically inaccurate.

History and popular use
A version of the sign was found in Germany by Patricia Bradley of Medford, Massachusetts. With her sister Helen she started a company, PHOB, to market them in the US, but had only limited success until partnering with Michael Lerner. 

Lerner was told about the signs after recounting his experience of aggressive drivers when driving his baby nephew home in busy traffic. An urban legend claims that the death of a baby led to the creation of the signs, but there is no truth to this claim.  Lerner eventually bought PHOB for approximately US$150,000, and changed the name to "Safety 1st". The company later diversified into infant and child care products and is now part of Dorel Industries.

The sign became a ubiquitous fad, flourishing in 1985. Its use in the US rapidly declined in 1986 as parody imitations with lines like "Baby I'm Bored", "Pit Bull on board", and "Mother-In-Law in Trunk" became popular, although its popularity continues in the United Kingdom (along with other versions such as "Princess on board" and "Little Person on board"), in Italy and in Japan (usually saying "Baby in Car", with the sign written in either English or Japanese script) well into the 21st century. 

Despite waning in popularity, the signs have entered the American lexicon. In 1993, The Simpsons episode "Homer's Barbershop Quartet" featured a barbershop quartet tune called "Baby on Board". The song was written by Homer Simpson in a flashback to 1985 when Marge bought a sign, hoping it would stop people from "intentionally ramming our car".

Following popular request and trials in 2005, Transport for London (TfL) began issuing badges with the TfL logo and the words "Baby on board!" to pregnant women travelling on the London Underground, to help other passengers identify pregnant travellers who would like to be offered a seat.

References

Further reading
 

1980s fads and trends
Infancy
Infographics
Road transport